Havsa is a district of Edirne Province of Turkey. The mayor is Aydın Balkan (AKP). The population is 8,602 as of 2010.

History
Havsa was founded by Ancient Romans. When the empire split into two, the city fell into the area of the Byzantine Empire. In 1331, the land was captured by Turks under the leadership of Murat I and the area was named Hosa. After Edirne became the center of the Ottoman Empire, the Rûm population in Hosa abandoned the city and moved to Istanbul and Thessaloniki. After the capture of Constantinople, Turks from Anatolia moved in, making the town Turkish.

Geography
The town is 69 kilometers away from Edirne. The district borders the Edirne district to the north and west, the district of Süloğlu to the north, the province of Kırklareli to the east and the district of Uzunköprü to the south. The town is located 218 kilometers from Istanbul.

Name
The town was called Hosa by the Turks in 1331. After Hafsa Hatun moved to the town, it was called Hafsa. Later, the two names were combined to form the current name Havsa.

References

Populated places in Edirne Province
Districts of Edirne Province